Sun Carriage was a band formed in 1988 and disbanded late Spring of 1993. Sun Carriage was founded by Ron Price and Mathew Watts in Plymouth and relocated to Camden where they were joined by fellow Plymouth exile Chris Leech. They recorded the "Sun Carriage / Determined" demo 7"  (written by Ron Price; a very rare vinyl with only about ten pressed) for the fledgling Head Records run by Jeff Barrett (later the founder of Heavenly). With principal songwriter Watts, the line up evolved to include Bex who had originally drummed in Loop and Sarah Wills on bass. Sun Carriage toured with Loop throughout the UK and supported various bands of the time such as House Of Love, Spacemen 3, Lush and even Happy Mondays. Bex was later replaced by Michael Ryan on drums, and soon after Chris Leech left, leaving the band as a trio of Watts, Ryan and Wills for the rest of its natural life.

Their music combined the artful influences of David Bowie with a bit of the pre-grunge and rock 'n roll/garage of Iggy Pop and the Stooges, some of the heaviness of Led Zeppelin, Black Sabbath plus Neil Young and a dash of early Roxy Music often at a slow pace reminiscent of the Melvins and with a similar rawness to early Nirvana.

Recordings
Sun Carriage released two 12" EPs on the Wiiija catalogue: 
 
 Sun Carriage EP - tracks : Sarah C.D, J.B. Smiles, Sick Dog Crawling (Can't See Love) - 
 Wij 8   1990
 A Kiss to Tell EP - tracks : A Kiss To Tell (Parts 1 & 2), B.A.B.E, Written By... -   Wij 10  1991     reaching No2 in N.M.E indie chart

Other releases
 Now That's Disgusting Music - Live At The Sausage Machine { various } Too Pure 1, 1990

Broadcasts
John Peel BBC Radio 1 Session  -  09/06/1991

 Sick Dog Crawling
 BABE
 Kiss To Tell
 Written By

Produced by Dale Griffin  at  BBC Maida Vale 3

Sun Carriage enjoyed other radio play and notably supported Therapy? on their mini tour of Ireland, North and South in February 1992, after previously touring there in 1991 with Dinosaur Jr. They also enjoyed sharing the stage with label-mates Silverfish and Jeff Barrett's [HEAD] Records signings Loop and being acquainted with Gallon Drunk. The band split in 1993, with Mathew Watts going on to form Codiac which only recorded a demo cassette in late June of that year.

Mathew returned to Cornwall in the late 1990s where he teamed up with his old "Saltash Monster" mates, including ex-members of Voices and Elephant Talk. From Feb 2008 to May 2009 Mathew Watts was guitarist with The Nameless Ones, a Saltash band, alongside Andy Copelin (drums), Adam Speare (Bass) and Stephen Beer (vocals); please see links

After contracting cancer, Mathew passed away at the St. Lukes Hospice, Plymouth, on 13 May 2009.

References

External links
Home of Wiiija recordings
John Peel sessions
The Nameless Ones

English rock music groups
Musical groups from the London Borough of Camden